Bansko Municipality is situated in southwestern Bulgaria and is one of the municipalities of Blagoevgrad Province.

Settlements

Demographics

Religion
According to the latest Bulgarian census of 2011, the religious composition, among those who answered the optional question on religious identification, was the following:

References

External links

 Bansko municipality website 
 Pictures and images from Bansko Ski Resort 
 

Municipalities in Blagoevgrad Province